Suno Sasurjee (Translation: Listen Father-in-law) is an Indian Hindi-language romantic comedy film directed by Vimal Kumar. The film stars Aftab Shivdasani and Ameesha Patel. The film also features Kader Khan, Gulshan Grover and Asrani in supporting roles.

Synopsis
Mr. Raj K. Saxena (Kader Khan) is known for his parsimony. Everything he does and thinks is valued with money, and ways he can accumulate it. His daughter, Kiran (Ameesha Patel), is the opposite, a spendthrift. Mr. Saxena borrows money from elderly people, assuring them of returning the loan with a handsome rate of interest after about 20 years, knowing fully well that none of them will survive 20 years. Then he meets with the son of one of such lender, aptly named after him viz. Raj K. Saxena (Aftab). Mr. Saxena refuses to repay the amount, swallows the proof, the only evidence, and asks Raj to get out, which he does so. Raj is determined to get his money, and wants Kiran to fall in love with him. Kiran does so, and brings him over to introduce him to her shocked and speechless dad. Things change when Raj inherits a large amount of money, ironically left by Mr. Saxena maternal grandmother, and it is Mr. Saxena who is now anxious to get in the good books of Raj, with hilarious results.

Cast
Aftab Shivdasani as Raj Saxena
Ameesha Patel as Kiran Saxena
Gulshan Grover as Shera Aflatoon
Kader Khan as Raj K. Saxena
Asrani as Murli Shergill 
Shakti Kapoor as Kiran's Brother-in-Law
Kiradaas as Danny's Cousin-in-Law
Kunickka Sadanand as Mrs Kiran Kumar
Mushtaq Khan as Principal
Achala Sachdev as Mrs Gunkaari
Tej Sapru as Shera's younger brother

Soundtrack

Critical response
Taran Adarsh of Bollywood Hungama gave the film 1 star out of 5, writing: "On the whole, SUNO SASURJEE is a stale product with dim chances."

References

External links
 

2004 films
2000s Hindi-language films
Films directed by Vimal Kumar